Buffalo Head Prairie is an unincorporated community in Mackenzie County, Alberta, Canada. It is named for the nearby Buffalo Head Hills.

Localities in Mackenzie County